High Point Christian Academy (HPCA) is a private, college preparatory, Christian school located in High Point, North Carolina, United States serving students in preschool (2-, 3-, and 4-year-olds) through twelfth grade. HPCA is a member of the Association of Christian Schools International (ACSI), Southern Baptist Association of Christian Schools (SBACS) and Triad Association of Non-Public Schools (TANP).

History
Founded by the Green Street Baptist Church, High Point Christian Academy opened in August 1996 with 96 students in kindergarten through third grade. One grade was added per year which made the first graduating class the class of 2006. The school had added its high school program with the 2002–2003 school year. There are now well over 800 students in attendance.

Admissions 
The Admissions process at High Point Christian Academy varies. For transitional kindergarten students applicants must be at least five years of age before his or hers school year. Grades 1–12 admissions are based on the students recent report cards, standardized test scores, while grades 6–12 applicants must provide information from the previous school where the student most recently attended. For applicants seeking admission in grades 10–12 must submit a copy of his or hers high school transcript and conduct an interview with the principal at HPCA. Candidates will receive a notification on their status for admission.

Campus

High Point Christian Academy shares a campus with Green Street Baptist Church. TK–8th grade is located in one building and 9–12 is in a separate building.

Extracurricular activities

Athletics
High Point Christian Academy fields teams in baseball, basketball, cheerleading, cross country, football, golf, soccer, softball, swimming, tennis, track and volleyball. The Cougars field 33 competitive athletic teams in these 12 different sports and compete at the 3A level in the Piedmont Triad Athletic Conference (PTAC) and North Carolina Independent Schools Athletic Association (NCISAA).

The first teams in the school's history were the boys' and girls' basketball teams, which began in the 1999–2000 winter season. In 2015–16 season the boys varsity team received national attention by adding five-star recruit Edrice Adebayo. HPCA was ranked 1st in North Carolina and 21st in the nation. HPCA finished with a record of (27–6).

State championships

The HPCA Cougars have won 11
NCISAA / PTAC championships & 44 Conference championships in total.

Baseball: 2009, 2019, 2022
Football: 2015, 2016 
Swimming (boys): 2009, 2010 
Swimming (girls): 2010 
Softball: 2013, 2022

Volleyball: 2009

Fine arts
High Point Christian Academy also contains a fine arts program which includes art, band, drama, publications and chorus.

Curriculum
Certified teachers lead the challenging academic program, utilizing a variety of textbook resources in the teaching of Math, Science, Language, Reading, Spelling, Social Studies and Bible. Integration of Scripture takes place across the curriculum as Biblical principles are applied to everyday learning. Additional areas of study include Art, Computers, Physical Education, Music, Foreign Language, and Library.
The textbooks used are from A-Beka, ACSI, Sadlier-Oxford Vocabulary, MacMillan/McGraw-Hill, and Bob Jones.

Notable alumni
Edrice Adebayo (born 1997), NBA player

References

External links
 

Baptist schools in the United States
Buildings and structures in High Point, North Carolina
Christian schools in North Carolina
Educational institutions established in 1996
Private elementary schools in North Carolina
Private high schools in North Carolina
Private middle schools in North Carolina
Schools accredited by the Southern Association of Colleges and Schools
Schools in Guilford County, North Carolina
1996 establishments in North Carolina